The Manchukuo National Railway Tehosa class steam locomotives were a class of 4-6-0 passenger steam locomotives operated by the Manchukuo National Railway. Originally built for the South Manchuria Railway (Mantetsu), they later transferred to the MNR. The "Teho" name came from the American naming system for steam locomotives, under which locomotives with 4-6-0 wheel arrangement were called "Ten-Wheeler".

History
Together with the Sorisa class, these five passenger locomotives built by Beyer, Peacock & Company in 1912 were the first locomotives Mantetsu ordered from England. Designated class F2, in 1920 they were reclassified Tehosa (テホサ) class, and between then and 1926 they were rebuilt with superheaters. They were used on ordinary passenger trains on both the main line and the Anfeng Line. In 1927 four of the five were loaned to the Sitao Railway, but after the Mukden Incident in 1931, all five were leased to the Fengshan Railway. After the nationalisation of the Fengshan Railway and other privately held railway companies to create the Manchukuo National Railway in 1933, they were taken over by the Manchukuo National, where they were designated Tehoko (テホコ) class. Under the new unified classification system introduced in 1938, the class was returned to its earlier Tehosa classification.

Postwar
At the end of the Second Sino-Japanese War, three were assigned to the Fengtian Railway Bureau and two to the Qiqihar bureau. They were taken over by the Republic of China Railway in 1945, but their subsequent fate is unknown.

References

4-6-0 locomotives
Beyer, Peacock locomotives
Railway locomotives introduced in 1912
Steam locomotives of China
Standard gauge locomotives of China
Rolling stock of Manchukuo